The leftist publishing house Trikont was founded in 1967 in Munich by Gisela Erler and others. The record label has its origins in the protest and alternative movements of the 1970s and derived its name from geographical concept 'Trikont', which refers to the three continents Asia, Africa and South-America. On July 20, 2010, Christine Dombrowsky died at the age of only 59. Shortly before her death, she handed over the archive to the "Archive of the Munich Workers' Movement".

See also
 List of record labels

References

External links
 Official site (English)
 Official site (German)
 (German article)

Book publishing companies of Germany
German independent record labels
1967 establishments in West Germany
Publishing companies established in 1967
Publishing companies of Germany